Anna Chakvetadze was the defending champion, but chose not to participate. 
Andrea Hlaváčková won the title by defeating Mona Barthel in the final 7–6(10–8), 6–3.

Seeds

Main draw

Finals

Top half

Bottom half

References
 Main Draw
 Qualifying Draw

EmblemHealth Bronx Open - Singles